The Trouble with Bliss (formerly titled East Fifth Bliss) is an American indie comedy film directed by Michael Knowles and starring Michael C. Hall, Chris Messina, Brie Larson, Peter Fonda, and Lucy Liu. It was released on March 23, 2012, in the United States.

Synopsis
Morris Bliss is a 35-year-old man with poor job prospects who lives with his widowed father, and falls into a romantic relationship with the 18-year-old daughter of a former high-school classmate.

Production 
Director Michael Knowles knew Douglas Light in passing as they both frequent the same cigar lounge, and approached him about adapting his novel into a screenplay. They met to work on the screenplay several times a week and smoke cigars.

Reception

Critical response 
On Rotten Tomatoes the film has an approval rating of 33% based on reviews from 18 critics, with an average rating of 4.45/10. On Metacritic the film has a weighted average score of 38 out of 100 based on reviews from 12 critics, indicating "generally unfavorable reviews".

The New York Times Stephen Holden wrote that the film "evokes forerunners as dissimilar as Moonstruck and After Hours in its eccentric mix of the everyday and the surreal" but "more often than not confuses eccentricity with originality" and ends up as a "sweet-natured, low-testosterone trifle." The Hollywood Reporter'''s Frank Scheck wrote that Hall has a "natural charisma" while Fonda displays "gravitas and sly humor", and Liu is "appealing and funny," but "despite their efforts, The Trouble With Bliss, as evidenced by its punning title, feels far too pleased with itself." NPR reviewer Ian Buckwalter found the characters in the book "full of color and whimsy on the page" but, in the film, "without the time or space to flesh them out more, their quirks seem labored and forced."

 Box office 
The film's opening-weekend gross was $4,619. The film has made $13,093 as of April 26, 2012.

AccoladesThe Trouble with Bliss'' won Best Narrative Feature at the 2011 San Diego Film Festival. It was the opening-night film at the 2011 Naples International Film Festival and at the 2011 Newport Beach Film Festival.

The film was nominated for Best Editing at the 2011 Woodstock Film Festival.

References

External links
 

2012 films
2012 comedy-drama films
American comedy-drama films
American independent films
2012 independent films
2010s English-language films
2010s American films